is a former Japanese football player.

Club statistics
Updated to 22 February 2016.

References

External links

J. League (#28)
 Contract with Kazuya Okazaki.
 Player Profile on Albirex Niigata (S) Official Website.

1991 births
Living people
Association football people from Hiroshima Prefecture
Japanese footballers
J2 League players
Japan Football League players
Fagiano Okayama players
Verspah Oita players
Association football midfielders